Eliakim Parker Scammon (December 27, 1816 – December 7, 1894) was a career officer in the United States Army, serving as a brigadier general in the Union Army during the American Civil War.

Early life and career
Scammon, a native of Whitefield, Maine, was appointed from his district to the United States Military Academy in West Point, New York, graduating 9th in the Class of 1837. He remained at West Point after graduation, serving as Assistant Professor of Mathematics from August 1837 to September 1838. Due to his ranking and abilities, he was selected as one of the original officers in the newly created U.S. Army Corps of Topographic Engineers in 1838. He served in the Seminole Wars and the Mexican–American War, serving under Winfield Scott in the Army of Occupation. He was elevated to captain in 1853 and assigned to various surveying assignments, but was dismissed from the service on June 4, 1856.

He moved to Ohio and became Professor of Mathematics at Mount Saint Mary's College, and then was President and Professor of Mathematics, Polytechnic College of the Catholic Institute in Cincinnati.  He had converted to Catholicism in 1846.

Civil War service
With the outbreak of the Civil War, Scammon offered his services to William Dennison, the Governor of Ohio in June 1861 and was appointed as Colonel of the 23rd Ohio Infantry, commanding two men who would later become Presidents, Rutherford B. Hayes and William McKinley. The regiment saw action in western Virginia and then in the northern part of the state.

Assigned to what became the IX Corps in the Army of the Potomac, Scammon then commanded the 1st Brigade, Kanawha Division. During the Maryland Campaign, he led his men in an attack up the slopes of South Mountain. When Brig. Gen. Jacob D. Cox briefly assumed command of the IX Corps, Scammon temporarily commanded the Kanawha Division, while Col. Hugh Ewing commanded Scammon's brigade. He fought well at the Battle of Antietam, where his men were counterattacked by late-arriving Confederate reinforcements under A.P. Hill.

Scammon was appointed brigadier general of volunteers in October 1862, and fought in the major actions of the Kanawha Division. He often clashed with his subordinate, Rutherford B. Hayes. Scammon, by then a division commander, was captured by partisan guerrillas from the 16th Virginia Cavalry on February 3, 1864, when they raided a steamboat carrying General Scammon on the Kanawha River. He returned to duty in South Carolina after being exchanged. He was again captured along the South Carolina coast, but exchanged and when he returned to duty, was placed in command of a brigade in the Department of Florida. He was honorably mustered out in August 1865.

Postbellum career
Following the war, he was the U.S. Consul to Prince Edward Island and then Professor of Mathematics at Seton Hall College in New Jersey.  Bowdoin College in Maine conferred the honorary Degree of A. M. on Scammon.

Scammon died in New York City. He was buried in the Calvary Cemetery in Long Island City, New York.

His brother, J. Young Scammon, became one of the wealthiest men in America as a Chicago attorney, newspaper owner, philanthropist and businessman.
Another brother, Charles Melville Scammon is a famous whaleman, naturalist and author of Marine Mammals of the Northwestern Coast of North America (1874).

See also

 List of American Civil War generals (Union)
 List of Ohio's American Civil War generals
 Ohio in the American Civil War

Notes

References
 Heitman, Francis, Historical Register and Dictionary of the United States Army 1789-1903, Washington: U.S. Government Printing Office, 1903.

Further reading
 Arney, Chris, West Point's Scientific 200: Celebration of the Bicentennial: Biographies of 200 of West Point's Most Successful and Influential Mathematicians, Scientists, Engineers, and Technologists, 2002.

1816 births
1894 deaths
Heads of universities and colleges in the United States
Burials at Calvary Cemetery (Queens)
People from Lincoln County, Maine
People of Ohio in the American Civil War
American military personnel of the Mexican–American War
American people of the Seminole Wars
Union Army generals
United States Military Academy alumni
Catholics from Maine